Douglas Clyde "Peahead" Walker (February 17, 1899 – July 16, 1970) was an American football and baseball player, and coach of American football, Canadian football, basketball, and baseball. Walker served as the head football coach at Atlantic Christian College—now Barton College—in 1926, at Elon University from 1927 to 1936, and at Wake Forest University from 1937 to 1950, compiling a career college football record of 127–93–10. At Elon, Walker was also the head basketball coach (1927–1937) and the head baseball coach (1928–1937). In 1952 Walker moved to the Canadian Football League (CFL) to become the head coach of the Montreal Alouettes. He remained with the team until 1959, tallying a mark of 59–48–1 in eight seasons. Walker also played minor league baseball with a number of clubs between 1921 and 1932. He managed the Snow Hill Billies of the Coastal Plain League from 1937 to 1939.

Early life
Walker was born on February 17, 1899, in Birmingham, Alabama.
He was the second of nine children born to Zachary T. and Miriam Walker. Walker's birth name was Daniah Clyde Walker. He changed his first name to Douglas while in college, but was known for most his life by his colorful nickname, which he acquired by the time he was a teenager. Walker briefly attended Birmingham College (later Birmingham Southern) then enrolled at Howard College in Birmingham. Though Walker played four seasons of varsity sports at Howard, he did not receive a degree from the college. He did complete college work and received a degree from Elon College while he was working there as a coach, graduating with the class of 1931., After leaving Howard and Birmingham, Walker began his professional baseball career. In the off-season he taught and coached at high schools in West Point, Ga. and in Roanoke, Ala, from 1922-25. Walker also wed his first wife, Carolyne, at about this time. They had two children, D.C. Jr., and Walter Hill Walker, both born during his high school coaching days.

Baseball
Walker played minor league baseball in parts of eleven seasons spanning 1921 to 1932. Primarily a shortstop, he also played at second base and third base. He posted a career .300 batting average and 30 home runs in 1078 games. Notably, he batted over .320 four times, with a career-high of .338 in 1928 with the York White Roses.

From 1937 to 1939 he managed the Snow Hill Billies of the Class D Coastal Plain League, leading them to the playoffs twice and to one league championship.

Football
Walker's coaching career began in 1926 at Atlantic Christian College, today known as Barton College, in Wilson, North Carolina, where he also played professional baseball for the Wilson Bugs of the Virginia League. In his one year as head football coach, Walker was 6–1–1 and his "Little Christians" (later, "Bulldogs") were scored upon only once. He also had success with the Atlantic Christian basketball and baseball teams.

Next, in 1927, Walker accepted the position of head coach of all three major teams at Elon College (now Elon University) near Burlington, North Carolina. He coached at Elon for ten seasons, earning a 44–41–4 record and winning four North State Conference championships.

Walker coached at Wake Forest University from 1937 to 1950. He compiled a record of 77–51–6 during his 14 years at the school and led the Deacons to two bowl games, a win over South Carolina in the inaugural Gator Bowl in 1946 and a 20–7 loss to Baylor in the 1949 Dixie Bowl. He is tied with Jim Grobe as the program's winningest head coach.

Walker left Wake in the spring of 1951 over a salary dispute with the college's new president, Harold Tribble. Following Wake Forest's superb 1950 football season, in which the Deacons went 6–1–2 and narrowly missed winning the Southern Conference championship, the athletic committee of the Wake Forest College Board of Trustees approved a contract extension, and a raise in Walker's annual salary from $7,500 per year to $9,000. The committee action occurred in December, but by when March rolled around President Tribble still had not approved it. Walker attempted to use a coaching offer from Yale University as leverage to force Tribble's hand, but Tribble called his bluff, offering a raise to $8,000 — or exactly what Yale had offered Walker to work as an assistant under Walker's long-time friend, Herman Hickman. Believing Tribble had gone back on a handshake deal, and miffed at the low-ball offer, Walker accepted the Yale position, ending the tenure of Wake Forest's most successful football coach.

After one year at Yale, he replaced the retiring Lew Hayman as the second head coach of the Canadian Football League's Montreal Alouettes. There he had a 59–48–1 record in eight seasons and won four division titles before retiring after 1959 season. After his retirement he became a scout for the New York Giants. He was elected into the Wake Forest Athletics Hall of Fame after his death in 1970.

Later life and death
One of Walker's longtime friends was Arnold Palmer, who Walker tried to recruit to his football team while Palmer was at Wake Forest.

Walker died of a stroke on July 16, 1970, in Charlotte, North Carolina, at the age of 71.

Head coaching record

College football

References

External links
 
 

1899 births
1970 deaths
Barton Bulldogs football coaches
Elon Phoenix athletic directors
Elon Phoenix baseball coaches
Elon Phoenix football coaches
Elon Phoenix men's basketball coaches
Montreal Alouettes coaches
Wake Forest Demon Deacons football coaches
Yale Bulldogs football coaches
Minor league baseball managers
Bloomington Cubs players
Decatur Commodores players
Norfolk Tars players
Rochester Tribe players
Snow Hill Billies players
Wilmington Pirates players
Wilson Bugs players
Wilson Tobacconists players
Winston-Salem Twins players
York White Roses players
High school football coaches in Alabama
Coaches of American football from Alabama
Baseball coaches from Alabama
Baseball players from Birmingham, Alabama
Basketball coaches from Alabama